Jiang Dawei (born January 22, 1947) is a Chinese folk singer, best known for a number of hit songs such as the theme song for the 1986 TV series Journey to the West. In 1968, he joined the Forest Trooper Art Troupe and began his singing career. In 1975 he joined the Beijing Central National Song and Dance Ensemble as a solo singer. He later became chairman of Central National Song and Dance Troupe, and the chairman of China Light Music Troupe.

Jiang Dawei has held concerts in the United States, Canada, Japan, Germany, Singapore, and Thailand.

Personal life
Jiang married Zhang Peijun, who is a former solo singer in the Central Ensemble of National Minorities Songs and Dances. They have a daughter, Jiang Yi (born 1978), she holds Canada citizenship.

References

External links
 About China: Jiang Dawei
 China Music Group Artists: Jiang Dawei
 Chinese singer Jiang Dawei promotes his concert in Beijing

1947 births
Living people
Singers from Tianjin
Chinese male singers
Yaohua High School alumni